The 1991 European Cup Winners' Cup final was a football match played between Manchester United and Barcelona on 15 May 1991 at Feijenoord Stadion, Rotterdam. It was the final match of the 1990–91 European Cup Winners' Cup and the 31st European Cup Winners' Cup final. It came at the end of the first season of the reintroduction of English clubs into European competition after the ban following the Heysel disaster in 1985.

The match ended 2–1 to Manchester United on the night, with both United goals coming from former Barcelona forward Mark Hughes. Ronald Koeman scored a consolation goal for Barcelona towards the end of the game, but it was not enough to prevent the Red Devils from becoming the first English side to win a European competition since they were banned in 1985. It was also United's first European title in 23 years, since the European Cup in 1968. This was their only Cup Winners' Cup title, in which they only played one more season, eliminated in the second round in 1991–92.

Route to the final

Match

Summary

Mark Hughes, who had previously played for Barcelona, scored both of the goals for Manchester United. His career had faltered after Terry Venables took him to the Camp Nou in 1986. A loan spell at Bayern Munich revived him prior to his return to United in 1988.

After a goalless first half, United went 1–0 up following a free-kick from captain, Bryan Robson, which was headed goalwards by defender Steve Bruce. United striker Mark Hughes tapped the ball over the line, although whether the ball had already crossed before Hughes touched it was in dispute for some time, with both Bruce and Hughes claiming the goal (Mark Hughes later credited the goal to Steve Bruce, but the official scoreline shows both goals as being scored by Hughes). For his second goal, Hughes cut the ball into the net from such an acute angle that he had to spin it off the outside of his boot to ensure that it found its mark.

After Koeman scored from a free kick, which came off the upright and hit the legs of United keeper Les Sealey before crossing the line, Barcelona had a late equaliser ruled out for offside and also had a shot cleared off the line. United finished the game 2–1 winners.

Manchester United were undefeated in all rounds (unlike Barcelona who lost two games in qualifying). Brian McClair scored at least once in every round that Manchester United were involved in, except the final.

The Spanish newspapers stated "The Red Devils came dressed in white, like angels" but went on to remark at how devilish United were in their beating of Barcelona.

Details

See also
1990–91 European Cup Winners' Cup
1991 European Cup Final
1991 UEFA Cup Final
2009 UEFA Champions League Final – contested between same teams
2011 UEFA Champions League Final – contested between same teams
FC Barcelona in international football
Manchester United F.C. in European football

References

External links
1991 European Cup Winners' Cup Final at UEFA.com
Daily Telegraph Article on the game
The Times Article on the game

3
Cup Winners' Cup Final 1991
1991
Cup Winners' Cup Final 1991
Cup Winners' Cup Final 1991
Cup Winners' Cup Final
Cup Winners' Cup Final
Cup Winners' Cup Final
May 1991 sports events in Europe
Sports competitions in Rotterdam
20th century in Rotterdam